S. Sathyendra is a theatre, serial, telefilm, documentary and film actor who has acted in sixty films in Kannada, Tamil, Telugu, Hindi, Malayalam and German languages. In addition, he is also a translator and interpreter in various Indian and foreign languages, and has also produced, directed and acted in short films.

Life in Bangalore 
He was born into a Telugu family in Tiputer in Karnataka. His father Sanjevaigh was the first Circle inspector of Police after the British in Karnataka. He was mostly brought up from the age of six to 21 in Bengaluru. From the age of 11, Satyendra became a self-made person due to the tragedies that happened in the family. He did all his schooling and college (Central College of Bangalore) in Bangalore. He has two postgraduations in Kannada literature and Philosophy and B.A. in Drama and Diploma in French and German and has working knowledge in Italian and Spanish. He is well versed in world literature and has published several articles in Kannada and English as a freelance journalist. He has also dabbled with publishing short stories, poetry and drama.

He played character roles in college plays and in amateur theatre and has worked as a theatre actor with B. V. Karanth and Girish Karnad the avant-garde giants of Kannada theatre. His first film was Grahana, a Kannada film in which he played a pivotal role. The film won the silver peacock award. His second film, in which he played a character role was Rishyasringa, produced by G. V. Iyer, which also won several awards. He is the first television actor in Karnataka in the children's film Aane Banthu Aane, directed by Chandrashekhara Kambara. He has acted in Our Town by Thornton Wilder, directed by Jacqueline Henny from the USA. He worked as an assistant director for a French documentary film dealing with possessed people in Dargha.

He also worked with Indologists from Germany and America in the field of shadow puppetry and marionettes for 2 years.

Life in Chennai 
He started his acting career with Ezhavathu Manithan, played a crucial role along with Raghuvaran, for whom also the film was a debut and the film went on to win the National and the South Asian awards. Thirty years passed and he has worked in 100 movies in Kannada, Tamil, Telugu, Hindi, Malayalam, German and Hollywood in various genres including telefilm, wildlife film, TV serials, documentaries and feature films.

He then worked thirteen years as a tutor, translator, interpreter in German, French, Spanish, Italian and also dabbled in twenty other foreign languages. He has acted in more than 40 short films mostly playing the lead roles, winning a few awards for his performances. The most talked about short film Knockout by Lenin won various awards.

He has acted in a German play, French play, and a Tamil play and participated in hundreds of theatre workshops conducted by European theatre personalities. He has given guest lectures on world cinema and conducted theatre workshops in colleges in Chennai.

Characters he played 
He played mostly highly intense, psychologically and artistically demanding characters. He is known for his strong sad face, his shabby and unique beard and hairstyle and powerful eyes. The characters played are watchman, beggar, drunkard, cobbler, drug addict, painter, movie and still cameraman, intellectually disabled 3-year-old child, journalist, writer, psychiatrist, voodoo black magician, professor, rapist/murderer, soft hero, thief, ward boy, love disappointed, comic main villain, eccentric king, street singer, pickpocket, petrol bunk attendant, layman, lame and blind.

The most famous actors he played with: Kamal Haasan and Amala in Satya, Raghuvaran in Ezhavadhu Manidhan, Mann Vasanai with Revathi, Sathyaraj and Nasser in Kadamai Kanniyam Kattupaadu, Major Sundarrajan in Ennai Pol Oruvan (telefilm), S. S. Rajendran in CP143 (a telefilm), Udhiripookkal Vijayan in Poovurangum Neram, Meendum Oru Kaadhal Kadhai with Pratappothen, Paatukku Oru Thalaivan with Vijayakanth, Mohanlal in Uyarum Gnyan Naadakey, Nana Patekar in Giddh, Sukanya in Aanandham (teleserial), Delhi Ganesh in Hemavin Kaadhalargal, Kanchana in Malayalam, Vikram in En Kaadhal Kanmani, Vijay in Priyamaanavale, Silk Smitha in Telugu, Sarath Babhu in Kokila and Nagarjun in Chaitanya.

Famous directors he worked with: G. V. Iyer, P. Bharathiraja,  Hariharan (director), Vipindas(m), P. N. Menon (director), Robert Rajshekar, Mouli, T. S. Ranga(k), Naagabarna(k), Pratappothen(m), Randor Guy, P. Chandra Kumar(m), Samuthirakani, Suresh Krissna, Santhana Bharathi, J.D Jerry, Sasi and V. C. Guhanathan.

Characters played from Best Literature

Jeyakanthan's Naan Irukkiren (Lead role), R. K. Narayan's Blind Dog, (Lead Role), Fyodor Dostoyevsky's The Honest Thief (lead role).

Filmography

Feature films

Short and telefilms

Serials

References 

http://www.thehindu.com/todays-paper/tp-features/tp-metroplus/meet-mr-versatile/article3198308.ece

External links

https://www.youtube.com/watch?v=JshNEQj5vzg
https://www.pinterest.com/pin/431149364306725145/

Living people
Tamil male actors
1960 births
Indian male film actors
Male actors in Tamil cinema